Ra'anana South railway station is an Israel Railways passenger station at the boundary between Ra'anana, Kfar Saba and Kfar Malal. It serves the residents of the southern Sharon region. The station is located on the Sharon Railway, in the center of the large interchange connecting highways 4 and 531.

The addition of this station and its sister station Ra'anana West will reduce the travel time for Ra'anana and Kfar Saba residents to Tel-Aviv to approximately 11 minutes when the link via Herzliya railway station opens. The two stations were opened on 3 July 2018, and the link via Herzliya is scheduled to open in early 2020.

With only 233,114 passengers recorded in 2019, the station is the least used in the Central District.

Location
The station is located within Highway 531, which was constructed at the same time. The station building is located at ground level east of Highway 4 and north of Highway 531. The station is adjacent to the Ra'anana Junction bus terminal, with buses to Ra'anana, Kfar Saba and the surrounding area.

A pedestrian bridge above Highway 4 is planned in the future, providing additional access to the station from the southeastern neighborhoods of Ra'anana.

Design
The passenger platforms are located underground inside a 1,825 meters-long rail tunnel under Highway 4.

Train service

Ridership

References

External links
Layout of the station (in Hebrew)
Summary of Israeli rail development

Railway stations in Central District (Israel)
Ra'anana
Railway stations opened in 2018